Antushovo is a rural locality (a village) in Pekshinskoye Rural Settlement, Petushinsky District, Vladimir Oblast, Russia. The population was 16 as of 2010. There are 7 streets.

Geography 
Antushovo is located on the Bolshaya Lipnya River, 18 km northeast of Petushki (the district's administrative centre) by road. Trud is the nearest rural locality.

References 

Rural localities in Petushinsky District